Jonathan 'Jonny' Adam Hughes (born 12 September 1985) is an English cricketer. Hughes is a right-handed batsman who bowls right-arm medium-fast. He was born in Slough, Berkshire.

Hughes made his debut for Buckinghamshire in the 2003 MCCA Knockout Trophy against Wiltshire. His next Minor counties appearance for Buckinghamshire didn't come until 2008, when he played a further Trophy match against Cambridgeshire. He played a single Minor Counties Championship match in 2008 against Norfolk.

Hughes made his first-class debut for Loughborough UCCE against Somerset in 2007. He played a further five first-class fixtures spread over 2007 and 2008, the last coming against Worcestershire. In his six first-class matches he scored 149 runs at a batting average of 21.28, with a high score of 45. With the ball he took 7 wickets at a bowling average of 34.14, with best figures 3/33.

References

External links
Jonny Hughes at ESPNcricinfo
Jonny Hughes at CricketArchive

1985 births
Living people
Sportspeople from Slough
Alumni of Loughborough University
English cricketers
Buckinghamshire cricketers
Loughborough MCCU cricketers